Peachy is the third single from singer-songwriter Missy Higgins' second album.

Peachy may also refer to:

People with the first name
 Peachy Kellmeyer, tennis player

People with the surname
Bathurst Peachy (1893–1953), American baseball player and coach

See also
 Life Is Peachy, second studio album by nu metal band Korn
Peachey, a surname